Kirsten Jensen can refer to:

 Kirsten Hedegaard Jensen (born 1935), Danish Olympic swimmer
 Kirsten Plum Jensen (born 1961), Danish Olympic rower
 Kirsten Jensen (curler) (born 1952), Danish curler and coach
 , Member of the European Parliament for Denmark
 , recognized as a 2019 International Rising Talent of the L'Oréal-UNESCO For Women in Science programme